The 1999 ICF Canoe Slalom World Championships were held in La Seu d'Urgell, Spain under the auspices of International Canoe Federation at the Segre Olympic Park. It was the 26th edition. A record eleven nations won medals at these championships.

Medal summary

Men's

Canoe

Kayak

Women's

Kayak

Medals table

References
Official results
International Canoe Federation

Canoe Slalom World Championships, 1999
ICF Canoe Slalom World Championships
International sports competitions hosted by Spain
Icf Canoe Slalom World Championships, 1999
Canoeing and kayaking competitions in Spain